This is a list of home video releases of the 1981 television series Danger Mouse and its 2015 reboot.

United Kingdom

1981 series
FremantleMedia released six Region 0 DVDs in 2001 through 2003, featuring 6-8 random episodes in each set. In September 2006, Fremantle Media released a further six DVDs, making all episodes available on DVD, and a 25th Anniversary 12-Disc DVD box set. Although the box set received mostly positive reviews, some cited the lack of chronological order of the episodes as a disappointment. A 10-disc "30th Anniversary Edition" box set was released on 26 September 2011, with the episodes in original UK broadcast order.  All UK box sets contain all 161 episodes, but where some stories originally aired in five-minute segments, these have been edited together to make a total of 89 episodes. This means much of David Jason's 'cliffhanger' narration is not present on the UK DVDs.

2015 series

United States
Several volumes of episodes were released on VHS by Thorn EMI-HBO Video, in association with Thames Video, during the mid-1980s; these releases included original bumpers which were cut from U.S. airings of the era.

A&E Home Video was previously licensed by Thames, TalkbackTHAMES, FremantleMedia International and FremantleMedia Kids & Family Entertainment to release the original 1980s Danger Mouse to DVD in the United States. They reflect the UK broadcast order and include the original serial format of some stories, retaining David Jason's linking narration. However, the character of Stiletto has his original Italian accent, which was not used in US versions of the series. In the US version, Stiletto spoke in a Cockney accent.

VHS (United Kingdom)

References

External links

 Dangermouse.com 
 
 
 
 A comprehensive listing of every Danger Mouse episode, with original transmission dates and episode descriptions.
 Danger Mouse appears on cover of Computer and Video Games magazine - September 1984.

Lists of home video releases
Danger Mouse